The 1981–82 AHL season was the 46th season of the American Hockey League. Eleven teams played 80 games each in the schedule. The New Brunswick Hawks finished first overall in the regular season, and won their first Calder Cup championship.

Team changes
 The Fredericton Express join the AHL as an expansion team, based in Fredericton, New Brunswick, playing in the North Division.
The Erie Blades, based in Erie, Pennsylvania, transfer to the AHL as an expansion team, from the defunct Eastern Hockey League, and play in the South Division.

Final standings
Note: GP = Games played; W = Wins; L = Losses; T = Ties; GF = Goals for; GA = Goals against; Pts = Points;

Scoring leaders

Note: GP = Games played; G = Goals; A = Assists; Pts = Points; PIM = Penalty minutes

 complete list

Calder Cup playoffs

Trophy and award winners
Team awards

Individual awards

Other awards

See also
List of AHL seasons

References
AHL official site
AHL Hall of Fame
HockeyDB

 
American Hockey League seasons
2
2